The 1970 Vuelta a España was the 25th Edition Vuelta a España, taking place from 23 April to 12 May 1970. The race revealed Augustín Tamames as a contender for the future at the Vuelta as Tamames riding in his first Vuelta held in the final week the race lead until the final individual time trial when Luis Ocaña time trialled himself into the lead. Ocaña had finished runner up in the previous edition of the race and won the two time trials in the 1970 Vuelta. It would be Ocaña's only win in the Spanish race.

Teams and riders

Route

Results

Final General Classification

References

External links
Race website

 
1970
1970 in road cycling
1970 in Spanish sport
1970 Super Prestige Pernod